USS Interdictor (AGR/YAGR-13) was a , converted from a Liberty ship, acquired by the US Navy in 1954. She was reconfigured as a radar picket ship and assigned to radar picket duty in the North Pacific Ocean as part of the Distant Early Warning Line.

Construction
Interdictor (YAGR-13) was laid down on 18 May 1945, under a Maritime Commission (MARCOM) contract, MC hull 3142, as the Liberty ship Edwin H. Duff, by J.A. Jones Construction, Panama City, Florida. She was launched 29 June 1945; sponsored by Mrs. Edwin S. Duff; and delivered 27 July 1945, to the McCormack Steamship Co.

Service history
She carried aircraft until entering the James River Reserve Fleet, Lee Hall, Virginia, 17 October 1945. Except for brief cargo service, she remained there until being acquired by the US Navy, 10 May 1957.

She was converted to a radar picket ship at the Charleston Navy Yard, Charleston, South Carolina, and commissioned Interdictor (YAGR-13), 7 April 1958.
 
Fitted with the latest and best electronic search and tracking equipment, Interdictor sailed 2 May 1958, for shakedown training in the Caribbean. She departed Charleston, 18 July 1958, and sailed to her new home port, San Francisco, California.

Arriving 13 August, the ship assumed her role as an ocean radar station ship, part of America's vast early warning defense system. Operating with search aircraft, Interdictor could detect, track, and report enemy aircraft at great distances, supplementing land-based radar stations, and controlling high-speed interceptor aircraft in case of attack. She also carried out weather reporting duties during her three to four week cruises in the Pacific Ocean.
 
Interdictors hull classification was changed 28 September 1958, to AGR-13. She continued on radar picket patrols for the Continental Air Defense Command (CONAD) out of San Francisco, until decommissioned 5 August 1965.

Decommissioning
Her name was struck from the Navy Directory 1 September 1965, when she transferred to the US Maritime Administration (MARAD) for lay-up in the Suisun Bay Reserve Fleet, Suisun Bay, California, where she remained until she was sold 13 June 1974. Her subsequent fate is not known.

Honors and awards
Interdictors crew was eligible for the following medals:
 National Defense Service Medal

See also 
 United States Navy
 Radar picket

References

Bibliography

External links 
 
 

Liberty ships
Ships built in Panama City, Florida
1945 ships
World War II merchant ships of the United States
Guardian-class radar picket ships
Cold War auxiliary ships of the United States
James River Reserve Fleet
Suisun Bay Reserve Fleet